Sir David Roche, 1st Baronet (19 January 1791 – 8 April 1865) was an Anglo-Irish politician. 

Roche was the second Member of Parliament for the UK Parliament for the Limerick City constituency from 1832 until 1838. He was first elected as a candidate for the Repeal Association. Roche was re-elected in 1835 and 1837 as a candidate of a Liberal/Repealer pact.

The Roche Baronetcy, of Carass in Limerick, was created for him in the Baronetage of the United Kingdom on 8 August 1838. In 1847 he served as High Sheriff of County Limerick.

Family
see

He was the son of David Roche of Carass, County Limerick, son of David Roche, Mayor of Limerick in 1749. His mother was Frances Maunsel of Limerick.

He married Frances Vandeleur on 14 February 1825. They had four daughters and one son, David Vandeleur Roche (b.1833).

His younger sister, Bridget Roche, married the infamous Neptune Blood, of Brickhill County Clare.

Notes

References

External links 
 

Politicians from Limerick (city)
1791 births
1865 deaths
Members of the Parliament of the United Kingdom for County Limerick constituencies (1801–1922)
UK MPs 1832–1835
UK MPs 1835–1837
UK MPs 1841–1847
Baronets in the Baronetage of the United Kingdom
Irish Repeal Association MPs
David